Edmond is a given name related to Edmund. Persons named Edmond include:

 Edmond Canaple (1797–1876), French politician
 Edmond Chehade (born 1993), Lebanese footballer
 Edmond Conn (1914–1998), American farmer, businessman, and politician
 Edmond de Goncourt (1822–1892), French writer
 Edmond Etling (before 1909–1940), French designer, manufacturer 
 Edmond Halley (1656–1742), English astronomer, geophysicist, mathematician, meteorologist, and physicist
 Edmond Haxhinasto (born 1966), Albanian politician
 Edmond Maire (1931–2017), French labor union leader
 Edmond Rostand
 Edmond James de Rothschild
 Edmond O'Brien
 Edmond Panariti
 Edmond Robinson
Edmond Tarverdyan, controversial figure in MMA

In fiction 
 Edmond Burke, the protagonist and title character of the 1982 play Edmond
 Edmond Burke, the protagonist and title character of the 2005 film Edmond, an adaption of the play
 Edmond Dantès, the protagonist and title character of the 1844 novel The Count of Monte Cristo
 Edmond Elephant, a character from the Peppa Pig franchise
 Edmond Honda, a character from the Street Fighter franchise
 Edmond, the protagonist of the 1991 film Rock-A-Doodle

See also
Edmund (disambiguation)
Edward

French masculine given names